Gołuchowice may refer to the following places:
Gołuchowice, Lesser Poland Voivodeship (south Poland)
Gołuchowice, Będzin County in Silesian Voivodeship (south Poland)
Gołuchowice, Zawiercie County in Silesian Voivodeship (south Poland)